Reino Kuuskoski's cabinet was the 43rd government of Republic of Finland. Cabinet's time period was from April 26, 1958 to September 29, 1958. It was a caretaker government. 

Kuuskoski
1958 establishments in Finland
1958 disestablishments in Finland
Cabinets established in 1958
Cabinets disestablished in 1958